In Person is a live album by Ike & Tina Turner and their backing vocalists the Ikettes. It was released on Minit Records in 1969.

Recording and release 
In Person was recorded at Basin Street West in San Francisco. The album peaked at No. 142 on the Billboard 200 chart and No. 19 on the R&B albums chart. An edited version of "Respect" was released by Liberty Records as a single in France in 1970.

Critical reception 
The album received positive critical reception. Record World magazine chose the album as a Pick of the Week: "Ike and Tina Turner and the Ikettes 'In Person' is always an electrifying experience and the package at hand proves it."
Billboard (June 14, 1969):Currently enjoying a deserved revival on the charts, Ike and Tina Turner, pus the Ikettes and the Kings of Rhythm, team up for a live performance at Basin Street West. Tina Turner's dynamic soul style re-energizes "Everyday People," "Son of a Preacher Man," "Respect," and "Funky Street" as the revue features hit soul tunes and that in-person flavor.

Track listing

Chart performance

References 

1969 live albums
Ike & Tina Turner live albums
Albums produced by Ike Turner
Minit Records live albums
Soul albums by American artists